Rečica is a small settlement on the left bank of the Reka River next to Ilirska Bistrica in the Inner Carniola region of Slovenia.

References

External links
Rečica on Geopedia

Populated places in the Municipality of Ilirska Bistrica